Sageretia randaiensis is a small woody shrub.  It has dark green, ovate-oblong leaves.  The shrub is found in the mountains of C and N Taiwan.

References
RHAMNACEAE

randaiensis
Flora of Taiwan